The Independent Spirit John Cassavetes Award is presented to the creative team of a film budgeted at less than $1,000,000 by the Film Independent, a non-profit organization dedicated to independent film and independent filmmakers. It is named after actor/screenwriter/director John Cassavetes, a pioneer of American independent film. The award is given to the directors, writers and producers of a film.

History
Created for the 15th Independent Spirit Awards, it was originally called the Independent Spirit Award for Best First Feature (Under $500,000). After that, the rules changed so that any feature film budgeted under $500,000 could be eligible (regardless of how many films the director has made), hence the new name. The first recipient of the award was the horror film The Blair Witch Project. In 2023, the rules changed to include any feature film budgeted under $1,000,000.

Winners and nominees

1990s

2000s

2010s

2020s

Multiple nominees
Sean Baker - 3 (no wins)
Jim McKay - 2 (one win)
Gary Winick - 2 (one win)
Josh Safdie, Benny Safdie - 2 (one win)

References

External links
Homepage

J
Awards established in 1999